Nossa moorei is a moth in the family Epicopeiidae first described by Henry John Elwes in 1890. It is found in the Indian state of Assam,  Bhutan, and China.

References

Moths described in 1890
Epicopeiidae